Ermelinda Pedroso Rodríguez D'Almeida (born 17 March 1952), known as Perla, is a Paraguayan-Brazilian singer.

Biography
Perla was born and raised in Paraguay. She was born into a musical family and began performing in a group called "Las Maravilles del Paraguay" with her siblings and her father.
In the early 1970s she moved to Brazil in search of challenges and opportunities. This is where she began performing in nightclubs as "O Bigode do Meu Tio" (The Mustache of My Uncle).
She rose to prominence in the 1970s with her hit Fernando, a Portuguese-language version of ABBA's song, from the same decade. During her career, she has sold more than 10 million records and won 10 Gold Records, 2 Platinum and a Double Platinum, among other awards. Through her career she has recorded songs in Spanish, Portuguese, English, and Italian.

Her greatest success she obtained with the music theme "Comienza amanecer" (start of dawn), which describes the situation that many women go through their husband's infidelity. This song dates from 1981. Currently, Pearl has concerts three times a week in small cities in Brazil. In 2006, she received a great tribute to her career in Paraguay. Pearl married a Brazilian, who was her employer and has an adopted daughter named Perlinha, who has attempted her own singing career. Perla also currently has a granddaughter.

Perla has suffered economic problems in her older age. While she lives in a house that she bought with the money she earned, her house is in a state of abandonment, a fact which was demonstrated on an episode of a Paraguayan television show named "Domingo Show" that was dedicated to her.

References

External links

Official website
Perla on YouTube

1952 births
Living people
People from Caacupé
Paraguayan people of Spanish descent
Paraguayan people of German descent
Paraguayan people of Guarani descent
20th-century Paraguayan women singers
Paraguayan expatriates in Brazil
People with acquired Brazilian citizenship